is a former Japanese football player. She played for Japan national team.

Club career
Nagadome was born on May 7, 1973. She played for Prima Ham FC Kunoichi. She was selected Best Eleven in 1995 season.

National team career
On June 15, 1997, Nagadome debuted for Japan national team against China. She was a member of Japan for 1999 World Cup. She played 4 games for Japan until 1999.

National team statistics

References

External links
 

1973 births
Living people
Place of birth missing (living people)
Japanese women's footballers
Japan women's international footballers
Nadeshiko League players
Iga FC Kunoichi players
1999 FIFA Women's World Cup players
Women's association football defenders